Seochang station is a signal box in Jochiwon-eup, Sejong City, South Korea.

Station 
Connection point of Gyeongbu Line and Osong line (connects Chungbuk Line to Seoul-bound Gyeongbu Line). There are only six tracks for freight trains and no platforms for passenger service.

Railway stations in Sejong